Michael John Vanderjagt (born March 24, 1970) is a Canadian former football placekicker who played in the National Football League (NFL) for nine seasons, primarily with the Indianapolis Colts. He served as the Colts' placekicker from 1998 to 2005 and was a member of the Dallas Cowboys during his final NFL season in 2006. Vanderjagt also played for four seasons in the Canadian Football League (CFL), where he spent three seasons with the Toronto Argonauts and one with the Saskatchewan Roughriders.

During his CFL career, Vanderjagt won two Grey Cups and received the Dick Suderman Trophy in 1996. His most successful NFL season was in 2003 when he became the first kicker to convert every field goal and point after touchdown during the regular season and playoffs, earning him Pro Bowl and first-team All-Pro honors. Vanderjagt retired as the NFL's most accurate field goal kicker at 86.5%, which is the seventh-highest completion percentage in league history. He is also known for missing high-profile field goal attempts and provoking controversy with outspoken comments and antics.

Early years
Vanderjagt attended White Oaks Secondary School, where he was a four sport athlete (football, basketball, track, and soccer). In 1988, he accepted a scholarship from Michigan State University as a quarterback and placekicker. However, he left Michigan State for Allan Hancock College in Santa Maria, California, where he took over placekicking duties from exiting freshman Jack Garvin (who left for the UCLA).

Vanderjagt punted and played quarterback for AHC until returning to Division I football, as solely a punter and placekicker, at West Virginia University for the 1991 and 1992 seasons. As a junior, he was the team's starting punter, registering 52 punts for 2,040 yards (39.2-yard avg.). In his final season he was switched to placekicker, ranking third in field goals made (15) and fourth in points scored (72) in the Big East Conference.

Professional career

CFL 1993–1994, 1996–97
After graduating from WVU in 1993, he returned to Canada and started a career in the Canadian Football League. Between 1993 and 1996, he was cut by four different CFL teams, getting some playing time with the Saskatchewan Roughriders in 1993. Not playing in the league in 1994 or 1995, Vanderjagt played for the Tampa Bay Storm of the Arena Football League. Vanderjagt also played for the AFL's Minnesota Fighting Pike in the 1996 season before returning to the Toronto Argonauts (who had previously cut him twice) for their 1996 season.

Over the next two seasons, Vanderjagt served as their regular placekicker and punter, as Argos won the Grey Cup in both 1996 and 1997; in those two games he was 9 of 9. For his 1996 Grey Cup efforts he was named the game's outstanding Canadian. He also led the CFL in yardage per punt in 1997. Following the 1997 season, Vanderjagt left the Argos to become a free agent, ultimately to play in the National Football League.

Indianapolis Colts
In 1998, Vanderjagt returned to the United States to join the Indianapolis Colts of the NFL, and was the team's placekicker through the 2005 season. He led the NFL in scoring in 1999.

In a 2000 playoff game against Miami, Vanderjagt successfully converted a 50-yard field goal in the fourth quarter, but missed a 49-yard attempt in overtime. Miami scored on the next possession to win the game.

Following the Colts' elimination from the postseason in 2002, Vanderjagt made critical comments about Colts quarterback Peyton Manning and head coach Tony Dungy to a Canadian television station. Vanderjagt questioned Manning's leadership skills and criticized Dungy for being "mild-mannered". During an interview at the 2003 Pro Bowl, Manning referred to Vanderjagt as the team's "idiot kicker" and accused him of being intoxicated during the interview.

In 2003, Vanderjagt became the first kicker in the league's history to go an entire season, including the playoffs, without missing a field goal or point-after attempt. (In 1998, Minnesota kicker Gary Anderson was perfect in the regular season, but missed a field goal attempt in the playoffs.) In the process, he made his first Pro Bowl and was named first-team All-Pro. He finished the regular season 37 for 37 in field goals and 46 for 46 in PATs. He was also perfect on three field-goal attempts and 12 PATs in the postseason. He did, however, miss a potential game tying 51-yard field goal in that season's Pro Bowl with three seconds left in a 55–52 loss to the NFC.

In 2004, he kicked 20 field goals, the lowest number of his career. But he also had considerably fewer field goal chances that season (25), as the Colts offense scored 61 touchdowns (nearly four per game), with Peyton Manning throwing a then NFL record 49 TD passes.

Vanderjagt's streak of 42 consecutive successful field goal attempts, the second longest in NFL history (the league does not include postseason or Pro Bowl games when compiling streaks), ended on September 9, 2004, when he missed a 48-yard attempt against the New England Patriots. The game was 2004's Monday Night Football opener, which the Colts lost 27–24.

After the Colts routed the Denver Broncos in the wild-card round of the 2004 playoffs, he told reporters that the Colts' opponents in the next round of the playoffs, the Patriots, were "ripe for the picking," and said "I think they're not as good as the beginning of the year and not as good as last year" (when they won the Super Bowl). Patriots safety Rodney Harrison fired back at him in an interview, calling him "Vanderjerk". Harrison's teammate, linebacker Willie McGinest, was more temperate in his response, but noted that "There's going to be a whole bunch of plays when he's not going to be out there [on the field]. The rest of his guys will be out there dealing with it." The Patriots eventually defeated the Colts 20–3 and went on to win Super Bowl XXXIX.

Vanderjagt indicated in a radio interview during the season that he might not return to the Colts for 2005, as his cap number was $2.8 million and the Colts might not be willing to pick up his salary for that season. He noted that he may return to the CFL, where his professional career began. However, he eventually signed a reworked deal and returned to the Colts.

In the 2005–06 NFL Playoffs, against the eventual Super Bowl XL champion Pittsburgh Steelers, Vanderjagt missed a 46-yard field goal attempt wide right with 18 seconds remaining, when the Colts were behind 21–18, costing the Colts a chance at overtime and ending the team's season. Walking off the field after the kick, he took off his helmet and threw it to the ground in anger (which cost his team a 15-yard unsportsmanlike conduct penalty). It was Vanderjagt's first field goal miss in the RCA Dome in the postseason.

Shortly thereafter, on January 19, 2006, Vanderjagt appeared on a lighthearted segment of the Late Show with David Letterman, during which he successfully kicked a 46-yard field goal, outside Letterman's Manhattan studio. Letterman, an Indiana native and Colts fan, served as the holder. The appearance was said to be one of the reasons why Vanderjagt was not re-signed in 2006.

During the 2006 offseason, Vanderjagt became a free agent and the Colts elected not to re-sign him. Instead, they signed free agent Adam Vinatieri, who had helped in the Patriots' recent Super Bowl titles. Following Vanderjagt's departure, the Colts would go on to win Super Bowl XLI that season.

Dallas Cowboys
In the 1990s and early 2000s, the Dallas Cowboys organization felt they could find placekickers without the need of paying a premium and adversely impacting the salary cap. On March 23, 2006, this philosophy ended when the Cowboys signed Vanderjagt to a three-year, $4.5 million contract that included a $2.5 million signing bonus.

Vanderjagt suffered a groin injury that kept him out of action for two weeks in preseason. He returned for the final game against the Minnesota Vikings, but missed two field goals in overtime of 32 and 33 yards (both misses were wide right), forcing the contest to end in a tie. Rumors quickly spread that Vanderjagt would be released by the Cowboys before the start of the regular season, after head coach Bill Parcells was quoted saying "I think he has been a good kicker. But he keeps telling me that I don't have to worry about him. Well, I'm worried about him now."

However, he remained on the roster, when the team was forced to keep backup kicker Shaun Suisham for the first game of the season against the Jacksonville Jaguars. Vanderjagt would appear in each of the Cowboys' subsequent games through Week 12. In Week 9, his potential game-winning field goal was blocked by the Washington Redskins as time expired. In Week 11 against his former team the Colts, he missed his only two field goal attempts, (both of these misses were also wide right) making it the first time since 2001 since he had done so. The fans were so upset, they booed a commercial he appeared in on stadium monitors. After he barely made a 22-yard field goal against Tampa Bay, the Cowboys had seen enough. On November 27, he was released and replaced with Martín Gramática. During his time with the Cowboys, Vanderjagt made 13 of 18 field goal attempts and was 2-for-5 on field goals from 35 yards or more.

Toronto Argonauts (second stint)
On May 31, 2008, the Toronto Argonauts signed Vanderjagt and traded their veteran kicker Noel Prefontaine to the Edmonton Eskimos. Vanderjagt claimed he really wanted to return to Toronto and his hometown "regardless of what NFL team called" as he missed the sport, missed the area, and missed his friends and family, which include his wife Janalyn and their 9-year-old son Jay Michael. He was released by the Argonauts on his request on May 28, 2009.

NFL career statistics

Personal life
Vanderjagt appeared in a Walt Disney film called The Garbage Picking Field Goal Kicking Philadelphia Phenomenon, where he was the stand-in during football scenes for Tony Danza as a placekicker for the Philadelphia Eagles. He is a coach for the Medina Mustangs Football Team in Medina, NY.

References

External links
 

1970 births
Living people
Allan Hancock Bulldogs football players
American Conference Pro Bowl players
American football placekickers
American football punters
Canadian expatriate American football people in the United States
Canadian football placekickers
Canadian football punters
Canadian people of Dutch descent
Canadian players of American football
Dallas Cowboys players
Indianapolis Colts players
Minnesota Fighting Pike players
Players of Canadian football from Ontario
Saskatchewan Roughriders players
Sportspeople from Oakville, Ontario
Tampa Bay Storm players
Toronto Argonauts players
West Virginia Mountaineers football players